William David Dyer (15 March 1917 – 7 January 1957) was an Australian rules footballer who played with Geelong and St Kilda in the Victorian Football League (VFL).

Family
The son of Charles Victor Dyer (1887–1959), and Alice May Dyer (1881–1970), née McHarry, William David Dyer was born at Geelong on 15 March 1917.

He married Leonora Lilian Partridge (1921–1972) in 1944.

Military service
He enlisted in the Second AIF on 27 June 1940, and was discharged on 8 October 1945. He saw active service in the Middle East and in New Guinea.

Death
He died at the Heidelberg Repatriation Hospital on 7 January 1957.

Notes

References
 
 World War Two Nominal Roll: Bombardier William David Dyer (VX33179), Department of Veterans' Affairs.

External links 

1917 births
1957 deaths
Australian rules footballers from Geelong
Geelong Football Club players
St Kilda Football Club players
Australian Army personnel of World War II
Australian Army soldiers
Military personnel from Victoria (Australia)